Mytilopsis africana is a species of bivalve mollusc in the false mussel family, Dreissenidae. It is widespread along the brackish water environments of coastal West and Central Africa. It may represent a lineage of Mytilopsis sallei, a Caribbean species, that invaded the western coast of Africa during the period of slave trade.

Habitat
Mytilopsis africana is a brackish water species that is widespread along lagoons, mangroves, and associated habitats. It grows attached to hard surfaces such as rocks, shells, and branches.

References

Dreissenidae
Molluscs of the Atlantic Ocean
Marine molluscs of Africa
Bivalves described in 1835